Henry (also known as Henry Crossroads) is an unincorporated community in Sussex County, Virginia, United States.

References

Unincorporated communities in Sussex County, Virginia
Unincorporated communities in Virginia